The 1849 Alabama gubernatorial election took place on August 6, 1849, in order to elect the governor of Alabama. Democrat Henry W. Collier won his first term with over 98% of the votes.

Candidates

Democratic Party
Henry W. Collier, Chief Justice of the Alabama Supreme Court from 1837 to 1849.

Election

References

Alabama gubernatorial elections
1849 Alabama elections
Alabama
August 1849 events